Edward Oldham Taylor (October 9, 1912 – November 5, 1984) was an American bridge player from Glendale, California.

Taylor was born in Kansas City, Missouri.

Bridge accomplishments

Wins

 North American Bridge Championships (7)
 von Zedtwitz Life Master Pairs (1) 1963 
 Silodor Open Pairs (1) 1959 
 Open Pairs (1928-1962) (1) 1957 
 Mitchell Board-a-Match Teams (2) 1957, 1962 
 Reisinger (2) 1959, 1962

Runners-up

 North American Bridge Championships
 Vanderbilt (1) 1963

Notes

External links
 

American contract bridge players
1912 births
1984 deaths
People from Kansas City, Missouri
People from Glendale, California